John Monroe may refer to:
 John Monroe (lawyer) (1839–1899), Irish lawyer
 John T. Monroe (1822–1871), U.S. politician, mayor of New Orleans
 John Monroe (speed skater), former Canadian speed skater
 John Monroe (baseball) (1898–1956), Major League Baseball infielder
 John Monroe, alter ego of Weasel (DC Comics)

See also
Jack Monroe (disambiguation)
John Monro of the Monro family (physicians)
John Munro (disambiguation)